The Shizhoupian is the first known Chinese dictionary, and was written in the ancient Great Seal script.  The work was traditionally dated to the reign of King Xuan of Zhou (827–782 BCE), but many modern scholars assign it to the State of Qin in the Warring States period (c. 475–221 BCE).  The text is no longer fully extant, and it is now known only through fragments.

History
The Shizhoupian dictionary, which was probably compiled sometime between 700 BCE to 200 BCE, originally consisted of 15 chapters ( piān), but six were lost by the reign of Emperor Guangwu of Han (25–56 CE) and the other nine chapters, except for scattered references, were lost by the Jin dynasty (266–420).

Title
Until recently, it was thought that the dictionary title referred to Shǐ Zhòu ( "Historian Zhou"), who allegedly served as Grand Historian (Tàishǐ 太史) in the court of Western Zhou King Xuan (r. 827–782 BCE). Both the c. 78 CE "Treatise on Literature" chapter of the Book of Han and the 121 CE Shuowen Jiezi postface record that King Xuan's "Historian Zhou" compiled the Shizhoupian.

The philologist Wang Guowei (1877–1927) disputed this traditional account with epigraphical evidence that the structure and style of the Shizhoupian characters did not match inscriptions from the Western Zhou period. Wang also doubted that zhòu was a person's surname, interpreting it to mean dú ("to study and understand the meaning of books; to read"), and concluded the dictionary title was likely taken from the first sentence Taishi zhoushu ("the Grand Historian reads the records").

The linguist Táng Lán (1901–1979) hypothetically identified Shi Zhou ("Historian Zhou"), who is only recorded in Shizhoupian contexts, with the differently named Shi Liu (Historian Liu) listed in the Book of Han chapter on "Notable Persons Past and Present".  In the Zhengzhang system of Old Chinese reconstructions these two words were pronounced *l'ɯwɢs and *m·ru. An ancient ding tripodal cauldron in the collection of the Shanghai Museum mentioned a Historian Liu from the correct historical period.

Modern scholars believe that zhou does not refer to a person, but means "read; chant". The lexicographer Liu Yeqiu suggested that the word shi may refer to the title given to students in ancient times who could recite 9,000 characters, with the title thus translated as "Shi (Reciters') Chants".

Zhou script
The term zhòuwén (Zhou Script) refers to the 220-some examples of ancient characters from the Shizhoupian that are quoted in the Han dynasty character dictionary Shuowen Jiezi. The zhouwen characters have been described as generally symmetrical and balanced, and are on average (although not always) more complex than the later seal characters. They contain many swirls and circles in place of later squared or rectilinear forms.

References

Sources
 
 
 
  (English translation of Wénzìxué Gàiyào , Shangwu, 1988.)
 . Hànyǔ Dà Zìdiǎn, 1992.  Húběi Císhū Chūbǎnshè and Sìchuān Císhū Chūbǎnshè; Taiwanese reprint (traditional characters) from  Jiànhóng Publ. in Taipei. .

Chinese calligraphy
Chinese dictionaries